The Days of Our Nights is the fifth album by American alternative rock band Luna, currently out of print in the United States. It includes a cover of the Guns N' Roses hit "Sweet Child o' Mine".

Release
The album was recorded as Luna's fifth LP for Elektra Records, a part of the Warner Bros. Records music family.  Because of the major label consolidations that occurred in the late 1990s, many alternative rock bands signed to major labels were dropped in this time period, including Luna.  In an ironic twist, the album was picked up by Jericho records, a subsidiary of Sire Records, which is also part of the Warner Bros. Records family.  It would, however, prove to be the final album by the band to receive major-label distribution.

The track "The Old Fashioned Way" is featured during the opening scene of the 2001 American crime/drama Kill Me Later starred  by actress Selma Blair.

Track listing
All lyrics by Dean Wareham, music by Luna, except where noted.
 "Dear Diary"  – 4:06
 "Hello, Little One"  – 4:49
 "The Old Fashioned Way"  – 4:36
 "Four Thousand Days"  – 4:21
 "Seven Steps to Satan"  – 4:58
 "Superfreaky Memories"  – 4:53
 "Math Wiz"  – 3:59
 "Words Without Wrinkles"  – 4:22
 "The Rustler"  – 4:07
 "U.S. Out of My Pants!"  – 6:08
 "The Slow Song"  – 3:17
 "Sweet Child o' Mine" (Guns N' Roses cover)  – 4:25

Personnel
Luna
 Dean Wareham – guitar, vocals
 Sean Eden – guitar, vocals 
 Justin Harwood – bass, guitar, mellotron, sampling, trumpet, string arrangements
 Lee Wall – drums, percussion

References

Luna (1990s American band) albums
1999 albums